Maher Mohammed Sabra (born 14 January 1992) is a Lebanese footballer who plays as a defender for  club Nejmeh and the Lebanon national team.

International career 

Sabra scored his first international goal for Lebanon on 1 February 2022, helping his side draw 1–1 against Iraq in the 2022 FIFA World Cup qualifiers.

Personal life
In addition to being a footballer, Sabra worked eight hours a day as an air conditioner repairman in 2020. In 2022, he opened a clothing store. Sabra has a son named Fadel (b. 2022).

Sabra was involved in the sports docuseries Captains, procuded by Fulwell 73 and shown on Netflix and FIFA+ in 2022, which documented six national teams and their captains in their respective 2022 FIFA World Cup qualification campaign.

Career statistics

International 

Scores and results list Lebanon's goal tally first, score column indicates score after each Sabra goal.

Honours
Nejmeh
 Lebanese FA Cup: 2021–22; runner-up: 2020–21
 Lebanese Elite Cup: 2021
 Lebanese Super Cup runner-up: 2021

References

External links

 
 
 
 
 

1992 births
Living people
Footballers from Beirut
Lebanese footballers
Association football defenders
Association football fullbacks
Lebanese Premier League players
Nejmeh SC players
Lebanon international footballers